Jan Wrzosek (6 March 1895 – 3 September 1939) was a Polish sports shooter. He competed in the 50 m rifle event at the 1936 Summer Olympics. He was killed in action during the September Campaign in 1939.

References

1895 births
1939 deaths
Polish male sport shooters
Olympic shooters of Poland
Shooters at the 1936 Summer Olympics
People from Stavropol
People from the Russian Empire of Polish descent
Polish people of the Polish–Soviet War
Polish military personnel killed in World War II